Bradley Gaskin is an American country music singer-songwriter. He signed with Columbia Nashville in 2011 and has released his debut single, "Mr. Bartender" after being discovered through a talent contest sponsored by John Rich of Big & Rich.  At the time, Gaskin had been working for his father hanging sheetrock.  The song entered the Hot Country Songs charts at number 51 on the chart dated for the week ending April 2, 2011. He made his Grand Ole Opry debut on August 20, 2011.

Discography

Extended plays

Singles

Music videos

References

External links
Official website

American country singer-songwriters
American male singer-songwriters
Columbia Records artists
Living people
Musicians from Gadsden, Alabama
BNA Records artists
Country musicians from Alabama
Year of birth missing (living people)
Singer-songwriters from Alabama